Weatherford Public Schools is a public school district based in Weatherford, Oklahoma, United States.

In addition to the city of Weatherford, the district also serves rural areas in southeastern Custer and northeastern Washita counties.

The mascot for Weatherford Public Schools is the Eagle.

Schools
Grades 9-12
Weatherford High School 
Grades 6-8
Weatherford Middle School
Grades 4-5
Weatherford West Elementary School
Grades 2-3
Weatherford East Elementary School
Grades PK-1
Burcham Elementary School

Student demographics
The following figures are as of October 2008

Total District Enrollment: 1,818
Student enrollment by campus
Weatherford High School (500)
Weatherford Middle School (379)
Weatherford West Elementary School (244)
Weatherford East Elementary School (247)
Burcham Elementary School (448)
Student enrollment by ethnicity
White: 1,377 (75.74%)
Native American: 192 (10.56%)
Hispanic: 191 (10.50%)
African American: 37 (2.04%)
Asian: 18 (0.99%)
Pacific Islander: 3 (0.17%)

References

External links
Weatherford Public Schools – Official site.

School districts in Oklahoma
Education in Custer County, Oklahoma
Education in Washita County, Oklahoma